Vlăsinești is a commune in Botoșani County, Western Moldavia, Romania. It is composed of three villages: Miron Costin, Sârbi and Vlăsinești.

Natives
 Dumitru Corbea

References

Communes in Botoșani County
Localities in Western Moldavia